The 1918 Central Michigan Normalites football team represented Central Michigan Normal School, later renamed Central Michigan University, as an independent during the 1918 college football season. The official 1918 football season was cancelled due to S.A.T.C. rules during World War I and the 1918 flu pandemic. However, a scrub team played one game, a 41-6 victory over Traverse City High School on November 16, 1918. Charles Tambling, who coached the team from 1902 to 1905, returned as head coach in 1918.

Schedule

References

Central Michigan
Central Michigan Chippewas football seasons
Central Michigan Normalites football